The 1950 Star World Championship was held in Chicago, United States in 1950.

Results

References

Star World Championships
1950 in sailing
Star World Championships in the United States
1950 in American sports